The 1999 Women's Australian Hockey League (AHL) was the 7th edition of the women's field hockey tournament. The tournament was held in various cities across Australia, and was contested from 25 June through to 18 July 1999.

NSW Arrows won the tournament for the fourth time after defeating Canberra Strikers 3–0 in the final. QLD Scorchers finished in third place after defeating Adelaide Suns 1–0 in the third and fourth place playoff.

Participating teams 

  Canberra Strikers
  NSW Arrows
  QLD Scorchers
  Adelaide Suns
  Tassie Van Demons
  VIS Vipers
  WAIS Diamonds

Venues

Competition format 
The 1999 Women's Australian Hockey League consisted of a single round robin format, followed by classification matches.

Teams from 7 of Australia's states and territories competed against one another throughout the pool stage. At the conclusion of the pool stage, the top four ranked teams progressed to the semi-finals.

Point allocation 

Every match in the 1999 AHL needed an outright result. In the event of a draw, golden goal extra time was played out, and if the result was still a draw a penalty shoot-out was contested, with the winner receiving a bonus point.

Results

Preliminary round

Fixtures

Classification round

Semi-finals

Third and fourth place

Final

Awards

Statistics

Final standings

Goalscorers

References

External links 

1999
1999 in Australian women's field hockey
Sports competitions in Canberra